The Whitemantle Range is a subrange of the Pacific Ranges of the Coast Mountains in British Columbia.  Located between the heads of Bute Inlet on the east and Knight Inlet on the west, it is extremely rugged and glaciated. Its highest summit is Whitemantle Mountain 2985 m (9793 ft).

The range is approximately 3400 km2 (1310 sq mi) in area and just south of the much higher and even more rugged Waddington Range, which is the highest part of the Pacific Ranges and also of the Coast Mountains.  East across the canyon-valley of the Homathko River is the Homathko Icefield.

External links
Whitemantle Range entry in the Canadian Mountain Encyclopedia

Pacific Ranges